Konia Kshetra is a region of Sant Ravidas Nagar district,  Uttar Pradesh, India. The Ganges River flows through its west end and changes its direction at Checuwan - Bhurra village, where the river's turbulence is reduced. The region has 17 villages with small, rural populations.

Villages 

Deeghuparwar
Dhantulasi Uparwar
Duguna Uparwar                                                                                                                                        
Khurd
Shanti

External links
http://wikimapia.org/#lat=25.2406818&lon=82.2561483&z=12&l=0&m=b&show=/4085231/Konia-Kshetra

References 

Bhadohi district